The Lo Nuestro Award for Regional Mexican Female Artist of the Year  is an award presented annually by American network Univision.The accolade was established to recognize the most talented performers of Latin music. The nominees and winners were originally selected by a voting poll, conducted among program directors of Spanish-language radio stations in the United States and also based on chart performance on Billboard Latin music charts, with the results being tabulated and certified by the accounting firm Deloitte. At the present time, the winners are selected by the audience through an online survey. The trophy awarded is shaped in the form of a treble clef.

The award was first presented to Mexican singer Ana Gabriel in 1992. Mexican-American performer Jenni Rivera holds the record for the most awards with nine, out of ten nominations. Mexican singer Graciela Beltrán is the most nominated performer without a win, with ten unsuccessful nominations.

In 2017, the award was not included in the categories.

Winners and nominees
Listed below are the winners of the award for each year, as well as the other nominees for the majority of the years awarded.

See also

 List of music awards honoring women

References

Regional Mexican Female Artist of the Year
Music awards honoring women
Regional Mexican musicians
Awards established in 1992